KEYE-FM (93.7 FM) is an adult contemporary formatted radio station licensed to serve Perryton, Texas.  The station is owned by Perryton Radio, Inc.

On January 25, 2011, KEYE-FM was granted a construction permit by the Federal Communications Commission to relocate to 93.7 MHz and a new tower location slightly east of the current tower. KEYE-FM moved to 93.7 FM on March 22, 2012.

References

External links

EYE-FM
Radio stations established in 1978
1978 establishments in Texas
Mainstream adult contemporary radio stations in the United States